Emran Ramadani (born 29 January 1992) is a Macedonian footballer of Albanian descent playing with FC Struga in the Macedonian First Football League.

Club career
Born in Tetovo, coming from FK Teteks, Emran Ramadani joined Serbian club FK Hajduk Kula and played eleven games with them in the 2010–11 Serbian SuperLiga.

In summer 2011 he returned to Macedonia and joined Macedonian First League side FK Shkëndija playing with them the first half of the 2011–12 season and winning the 2011 Macedonian Super Cup title. Then he played a year and a half with second-tier side FK Korabi, before returning to Macedonian First League this time by joining FK Renova in summer 2013.  He played with Renova in both matches of the first round of the 2015–16 UEFA Europa League.

After playing with Renova  seasons, he moved to Albanian side FK Partizani Tirana during winter-break of the 2017–18 season.

Honours
Shkëndija
Macedonian Super Cup: 2011

References

1992 births
Living people
Sportspeople from Tetovo
Albanian footballers from North Macedonia
Macedonian footballers
Association football wingers
FK Teteks players
FK Hajduk Kula players
KF Shkëndija players
FK Korab players
FK Renova players
FK Partizani Tirana players
FC Struga players
Macedonian First Football League players
Serbian SuperLiga players
Kategoria Superiore players
Macedonian expatriate footballers
Expatriate footballers in Serbia
Macedonian expatriate sportspeople in Serbia
Expatriate footballers in Albania
Macedonian expatriate sportspeople in Albania